The Ormsby Brothers were a short-lived New-Zealand-Australian musical group, most famous for their version of "You Don't Own Me" which peaked at number 5 in Australia in mid-1973.

The Ormsby Brothers are from New Zealand's Waikato region.

The group's debut single was a cover of "I Saw Mummy Kissing Santa Claus" on His Masters Voice label. The song did not chart.

In May 1973, the group released "You Don't Own Me", which peaked at number 5 on the Australian charts. "Sweet Virginia" followed and a self-titled album was released.

Discography

Studio albums

Singles

References

Musical groups established in 1972
Musical groups disestablished in 1975